"The Black Mirror" is a Batman story arc written by Scott Snyder, and illustrated by Jock and Francesco Francavilla. The story was published in ten issues of Detective Comics in 2011 by DC Comics. It is known for being the final Batman storyline of the Post-Crisis DC Universe before the 2011 reboot initiative New 52.

Plot 
The plot tells the continued adventures of Dick Grayson as Batman, as Bruce Wayne continues his work for Batman Incorporated. Dick must battle against several villains, one of whom is selling various super villain weapons and items in an underground black market. Also, James and Barbara Gordon must contend with the return of James Gordon Jr., whom they have ex-communicated due to his continued psychopathy.

Collected editions

References

Batman graphic novels